David Dickson (1583–1663) was a Church of Scotland minister and theologian.

Life

David Dickson of Busby was born in Glasgow in 1583. He was the son of John Dickson, a wealthy local merchant with premises on the Trongate. He was at first intended for the mercantile profession, but instead studied for the Church. After studying at Glasgow University he gained an M.A. around 1601. He was then appointed Regent of Philosophy in the University. On 31 March 1618. he was ordained as minister of Irvine. He declared against the Perth Articles, and was summoned before the Court of High Commission. Declining its authority, he was deprived of office. In 1622 he was allowed to return to his parish.

During the visitation of religious zeal in 1630, known as "the Stewarton Sickness," his prudence was notable, and the interests of practical religion were maintained. For employing in 1637 two of his countrymen, who were under the ban of Episcopal authority in Ireland, he was again called before the High Commission. As its authority, however, was then on the decline, he was no further troubled. In the same year an 
attempt was made to enforce the Service-Book, which he and his Presbytery moderately but firmly opposed.

In 1637, having given shelter to Robert Blair and John Livingston, driven from their charges in Ireland by the interference of the bishops there, he was again cited before the High Commission Court.

He took an active part in the Glasgow Assembly of 1638, and in 1639 acted as chaplain to an Ayrshire regiment commanded by the Earl of Loudoun. He was appointed the first Professor of Divinity at Glasgow University in January 1640 and later that year was elected Moderator of the General Assembly.

In 1650 he took a new post as Professor of Divinity at Edinburgh University. He was appointed to St Giles Cathedral (second charge) by the Town Council 12 April 1650, and admitted shortly after. Dickson was for a second time Moderator of Assembly 21 July 1652. In October 1662 he was deprived, and by the end of the year he was dead (buried 31 December).

He was a popular preacher, and highly instrumental in promoting the notable revival at Stewarton about 1625. Nor was he less zealous and useful in the overthrow of Episcopacy, having taken a prominent part in the business of the Assembly at Glasgow. When the Church unhappily divided into Resolutioners and Protesters, he became a leader in the party of the former.

He was the only son of John Dick or Dickson, a merchant in the Trongate of Glasgow, whose father was an old feuar of some lands called the Kirk of Muir, in the parish of St. Ninians, Stirlingshire. He was born in Glasgow about 1583, and educated at the university, where he graduated M.A., and was appointed one of the regents or professors of philosophy, a position limited to eight years. On the conclusion of his term of office Dickson was in 1618 ordained minister of the parish of Irvine. In 1620 he was named in a leet of seven to be a minister in Edinburgh, but since he was suspected of nonconformity his nomination was not pressed.

Having publicly testified against the Five Articles of Perth, he was at the instance of James Law, archbishop of Glasgow, summoned to appear before the high court of commission at Edinburgh on 9 January 1622; but having declined the jurisdiction of the court, he was subsequently deprived of his ministry in Irvine, and ordered to proceed to Turriff, Aberdeenshire, within twenty days. When he was about to set off northward, the Archbishop of Glasgow, at the request of the Earl of Eglinton, permitted him to remain in Ayrshire, at Eglinton, where for about two months he preached in the hall and courtyard of the castle. As great crowds went from Irvine to hear him, he was then ordered to set out for Turriff, but about the end of July 1623 was permitted to return to his charge at Irvine, and remained there unmolested till 1637.

Along with Alexander Henderson and Andrew Cant, he attended the private meeting convened in 1637 by Lord Lorne, against the bishops. The same year he prevailed on the presbytery of Irvine for the suspension of the service-book, and he was one of the deputation of noblemen and influential ministers deputed by the Covenanters to visit Aberdeen to invite ministers and gentry into the Covenant. The doctors and professors of Aberdeen were unconvinced, and after various encounters with the Covenanters published General Demandis concerning the lait Covenant, &c. 1638, reprinted 1662 to which Henderson and Dickson drew up a reply entitled Ansueris of sum Bretheren of the Ministrie to the Replyis of the Ministeris and Professoris of Divinity at Abirdein, 1638, reprinted 1663. This was answered by the Aberdeen professors in Duplyes of the Minsteris and Professoris of Abirdein, 1638.

At the assembly which met at Glasgow in 1638 Alexander Henderson was chosen in preference to Dickson to fill the chair, but Dickson delivered a tactful speech  when the commissioner threatened to leave the assembly, and in the eleventh session gave a learned discourse on Arminianism. The assembly also named him one of the four inspectors to be set over the university cities, the city to which he was named being Glasgow; but in his case the resolution was not carried out till 1640, when he was appointed to the newly instituted professorship of divinity. In the army of the covenanters, under Alexander Leslie, which encamped at Dunse Law in June 1639, he acted as chaplain of the Ayrshire regiment, commanded by the Earl of Loudoun, and at the general assembly which, after the pacification, met at Edinburgh in August of the same year, was chosen moderator.

In 1643 he was appointed, along with Alexander Henderson and David Calderwood, to draw up a 'Directory for Public Worship,' and he was also joint author with James Durham, who afterwards succeeded him in the professorship in Glasgow, of The Sum of Saving Knowledge, frequently printed along with the Westminster Confession of Faith and catechisms, although it never received the formal sanction of the church. In 1650 he was translated to the divinity chair of the university of Edinburgh, where he delivered an inaugural address in Latin, which was translated by George Sinclair into English, and, under the name of 'Truth's Victory over Error,' was published as Sinclair's own in 1684. The piracy having been detected, it was republished with Dickson's name attached and a Life of Dickson by Robert Wodrow in 1752.

In 1650 he was appointed by the committee of the kirk one of a deputation to congratulate Charles II on his arrival in Scotland. For declining to take the oath of supremacy at the Restoration he was ejected from his chair; he gradually failed in health and died in the beginning of 1663. His wife was Margaret Roberton, a daughter of Archibald Roberton of Stonehall (the youngest son of John Roberton, the 9th Laird of Earnock)  and sister of James Roberton, Lord Bedlay. They had three sons, of whom John, the eldest, was clerk to the exchequer in Scotland, and Alexander, the second son, was professor of Hebrew in the university of Edinburgh. The third son, Robert, born in 1630 in Irvine, Ayrshire settled in Ulster, Ireland in 1666.

Personal life
He married 23 September 1617, Margaret, daughter of Archibald Roberton of Stonehall, and had children— John, clerk to the Exchequer (who predeceased him); James (G. R. Sas., xxxviii., 241); David (who also predeceased him); Alexander, minister of Newbattle, Professor of Hebrew in the University of Edinburgh.

Works

Besides the works already referred to, he was the author of:

 'A Treatise on the Promises,' 1630. 
 'Praelectiones in Confessionem Fidei. Truth's Victory over Error,' 1684.
 'Explanation of the Epistle to the Hebrews,' 1685. 
 'Expositio analytica omnium Apostolicarum Epistolarum,' 1646. 
 'A Brief Exposition of the Gospel according to Matthew,' 1651. 
 'Explanation of the First Fifty Psalms,' 1653. 
 'Explication upon the Last Fifty Psalms,' 1655. 
 'A Brief Explication of the Psalms from L to C,' 1655. 
 'Therapeutica Sacra, seu de curandis Casibus Conscientiae circa Regenerationem per Foederum Divinorum applicationem,' 1656, of which an edition by his son, Alexander Dickson, entitled 'Therapeutica Sacra, or Cases of Conscience resolved,' was published in 1664; and an English translation, entitled 'Therapeutica Sacra, or the Method of healing the Diseases of the Conscience concerning Regeneration,' in 1695.

His various commentaries were published in conjunction with a number of other ministers, each of whom, in accordance with a project initiated by Dickson, had particular books of the 'hard parts of scripture' assigned them. He was also the author of a number of short poems on pious and serious subjects, to be sung with the common tunes of the Psalms. Among them were 'The Christian Sacrifice,' 'O Mother dear, Jerusalem,' 'True Christian Love,' and 'Honey Drops, or Crystal Streams.' Several of his manuscripts were printed among his Select Works, published with a life in 1838.
Hew Scott:
A Treatise on the Promises (Dublin, 1630) ;
Explanation of the Epistle to the Hebrews (Aberdeen, 1635)
Expositio Analytica Omnium Apostolicarum Epistolarum (Glasgow, 1645) ; 
True Christian Love, in verse (1649) ; 
Exposition of the Gospel of Matthew (London, 1651) ; 
Explanation of the Psalms, 3 vols. (London, 1653-5); 
Therapeutica Sacra (Edinburgh, 1656 — trans., Edinburgh, 1664) ; 
A Commentary on the Epistles (London, 1659) ; 
Praelectiones in confessionem fidei ; translated under the title of Truth's Victory over Error (London, 1688, and Wodrow Society, 1847) ; 
several pamphlets in the Disputes with the Doctors of Aberdeen, and some in defence of the Public Resolutions.
The " Directory for Public Worship " was drawn up by him, with the assistance of Alexander Henderson and David Calderwood — and the "Sum of Saving Knowledge," in conjunction with James Durham. 
Some minor poems, "The Christian Sacrifice," and " O Mother dear, Jerusalem."

Bibliography
Select Practical Writings also has a 48 page Life of David Dickson by "The Editor".
Hew Scott's Bibliography
Edin. Counc, Test., Glasgow (Marr.), Canongate (Bur.), and Reg. (Pur.) ; 
Baillie's Lett., 
Lamont's and Nicoll's Diaries; 
Wodrow's Life, Hist., i., iv., and Anal., i., iii. ; 
Livingston's Charac, 
Dict. Nat. Biog.
Henderson's Bibliography:
Life by Wodrow, prefixed to Truth's Victory, and reprinted in Select Biographies published by Wodrow Society in 1847, ii. 1-14; additional details in i. 316-20; 
Robert Baillie's Letters and Journals (Bannatyne Club); Calderwood's History of the Kirk of Scotland, vol. vii.
Spalding's Memorials of the Troubles (Spalding Club); 
Gordon's Scots Affairs (Spalding Club); 
Sir James Balfour's Annals; 
Wodrow's History of the Sufferings of the Church of Scotland; 
Lane's Memorials; 
Life of Robert Blair; 
Hew Scott's Fasti Eccles. Scot. ii. 8; 
Chambers's Eminent Scotsmen, i. 446-9.

References
Citations

Sources

 

Attribution

External links

1583 births
1663 deaths
17th-century Ministers of the Church of Scotland
Scottish Calvinist and Reformed theologians
17th-century Calvinist and Reformed theologians
17th-century Scottish theologians
Moderators of the General Assembly of the Church of Scotland